Fennelly is a surname. Notable people with the surname include:

Aidan Fennelly (born 1981), Gaelic football player from Laois in Ireland
Bill Fennelly (born 1957), the head women's basketball coach at Iowa State University
Brendan Fennelly (born 1956), Irish former hurling manager and retired player
Colin Fennelly (born 1989), Irish hurler
Frank Fennelly (1860–1920), 19th-century Major League Baseball shortstop
Ger Fennelly (born 1954), retired Irish sportsperson
James Mathias Fennelly (1929–2000), Chairman of the Department of Philosophy, Professor of History of Religions at Adelphi University, New York
Keeva Fennelly, camogie player and financial reporter
Kevin Fennelly (born 1955), retired Irish hurling manager and former player
Kevin Fennelly (senior), hurler from County Kilkenny
Leann Fennelly, camogie player and a student, played in the 2009 All Ireland camogie final
Liam Fennelly (born 1958), Irish retired sportsperson
Mary Fennelly, 19th president of the Camogie Association
Michael Fennelly (hurler) (born 1985), Irish hurler
Nial Fennelly (born 1942), judge of the Supreme Court of Ireland, Advocate General of the European Court of Justice from 1995 to 2000
Parker Fennelly (1891–1988), American actor who appeared in ten films, numerous television episodes and hundreds of radio programs
Seán Fennelly (born 1959), retired Irish sportsperson

See also
Fenella (disambiguation)
Fennel
Fennell
Vennel